Massachusetts House of Representatives' 10th Bristol district in the United States is one of 160 legislative districts included in the lower house of the Massachusetts General Court. It covers parts of Bristol County and Plymouth County. Democrat Bill Straus of Mattapoisett has represented the district since 1993.

Towns represented
The district includes the following localities:
 Fairhaven
 Marion
 Mattapoisett
 part of New Bedford
 Rochester

The current district geographic boundary overlaps with those of the Massachusetts Senate's 1st Bristol and Plymouth, 2nd Bristol and Plymouth, and 1st Plymouth and Bristol districts.

Former locale
The district previously covered part of Fall River, circa 1927.

Representatives
 Wm. H. Allen, circa 1858 
 Hattil Kelley, circa 1858 
 Alanson Borden, circa 1859 
 Saben P. Chamberlain, circa 1859 
 Edmund A. Davis, circa 1888 
 William S. Conroy, circa 1920 
 Edward F. Harrington, circa 1920 
 William Thomas O'Brien, circa 1951 
 Frank B. Oliveira, circa 1951 
 Antone S. Aguiar Jr.
 Maniel Raposa, Jr., circa 1975 
 Roger Tougas, circa 1984
 John C. Bradford, 1985–1993
 William M. Straus, 1993-current

See also
 List of Massachusetts House of Representatives elections
 Other Bristol County districts of the Massachusetts House of Representatives: 1st, 2nd, 3rd, 4th, 5th, 6th, 7th, 8th, 9th, 11th, 12th, 13th, 14th
 List of Massachusetts General Courts
 List of former districts of the Massachusetts House of Representatives

Images

References

External links
 Ballotpedia
  (State House district information based on U.S. Census Bureau's American Community Survey).
 League of Women Voters of South Coast (Marion, Mattapoisett, Rochester)

House
Government of Bristol County, Massachusetts
Government of Plymouth County, Massachusetts